The term striped skink may refer to any one of several species of skinks:

 Ctenotus robustus, a comb-eared skink from Australia
 Trachylepis striata or Euprepes striata, a skink from Africa
 Oligosoma striatum from New Zealand, a relative of the mastiff skinks

Animal common name disambiguation pages